Aurélien Panis (born 29 October 1994 in Saint-Martin-d'Hères) is a professional French racing driver. He is best known for being the son of the former Formula 1 driver, Olivier Panis. From 2017 he is one of the two drivers of Zengő Motorsport - the first non-Hungarian the team has fielded in the WTCC.

Career
Aurélien Panis began his career in 2011 in the national French F4 Championship. He finished tenth. In 2012, he joined Eurocup Formula Renault 2.0 and Formula Renault 2.0 Alps, but scored no points in Eurocup, and only 26 in Alps. He became a member of the Caterham Racing Academy, from Caterham F1 Team in 2013, and scored his first points in Eurocup Formula Renault 2.0. In 2014, he left Caterham but won two victories: one in Eurocup and another one in Northern European Cup.

He joined Formula Renault 3.5 Series for 2015, with Tech 1 Racing. Next year, in the series - which was renamed as Formula V8 3.5 Series - he scored two wins and finished the championship in 5th position.

In 2017, he decided to switch for touring cars as he started the year in WTCC with a Honda Civic TC1 car at Zengő Motorsport. But after five round, he split with the Hungarian team  and went towards TCR International Series where he participated with the Boutsen Ginion Racing squad. In the later championship he took one win with the Belgian team's Honda Civic TCR.

In 2019 he would race in World Touring Car Cup (FIA WTCR) with an Audi RS3 LMS at Comtoyou Racing.

Racing record

Career summary

* Season still in progress.

Complete Formula V8 3.5 Series results
(key) (Races in bold indicate pole position) (Races in italics indicate fastest lap)

Complete World Touring Car Championship results
(key) (Races in bold indicate pole position) (Races in italics indicate fastest lap)

† Did not finish the race, but was classified as he completed over 90% of the race distance.

Complete TCR International Series results
(key) (Races in bold indicate pole position) (Races in italics indicate fastest lap)

† Did not finish the race, but was classified as he completed over 90% of the race distance.

Complete World Touring Car Cup results
(key) (Races in bold indicate pole position) (Races in italics indicate fastest lap)

† Did not finish the race, but was classified as he completed over 90% of the race distance.

Complete European Le Mans Series results

‡ Half points awarded as less than 75% of race distance was completed.

Complete GT World Challenge Europe Sprint Cup results
(key) (Races in bold indicate pole position) (Races in italics indicate fastest lap)

References

External links
 
 

1994 births
Living people
People from Saint-Martin-d'Hères
French racing drivers
French F4 Championship drivers
Formula Renault Eurocup drivers
Formula Renault 2.0 Alps drivers
Formula Renault 2.0 NEC drivers
World Series Formula V8 3.5 drivers
Sportspeople from Isère
World Touring Car Cup drivers
Prema Powerteam drivers
Arden International drivers
RC Formula drivers
Blancpain Endurance Series drivers
European Le Mans Series drivers
TCR International Series drivers
World Touring Car Championship drivers
Auto Sport Academy drivers
Tech 1 Racing drivers
Audi Sport drivers
R-ace GP drivers
ART Grand Prix drivers
Saintéloc Racing drivers
Comtoyou Racing drivers
Cupra Racing drivers
Boutsen Ginion Racing drivers
GT4 European Series drivers
Zengő Motorsport drivers